Doja may refer to:

 Doja Cat, an American singer and rapper also referred to as Doja
 DoJa, a Java application environment specification
 "Doja" (Snot and ASAP Rocky song), 2022
 "Doja" (Central Cee song), 2022